Courcelles-le-Comte is a commune in the department of Pas-de-Calais, France.

Geography
Courcelles-le-Comte is located 11 miles (17 km) south of Arras at the junction of the D12 and D32 roads.

Population

Places of interest
 The church of St.Sulpice, rebuilt, as was most of the village, after the ravages of World War I.
 The Commonwealth War Graves Commission cemetery.
 Remains of an old castle.

See also
Communes of the Pas-de-Calais department

References

External links

 An unofficial website of the commune
 The CWGC cemetery

Courcelleslecomte